Gaultheria antipoda, commonly known as snowberry or fools beech, is a shrub in the family Ericaceae. It is  endemic to New Zealand.

Description 
G. antipoda flowers around November, followed by white to red berries in late summer and autumn. Unlike some other Gaultheria species that exhibit gynodioecy, G. antipoda is a hermaphroditic species (the individuals produce both pollen and seeds).

Distribution 
This species is found in the North Island between 37° - 39°30'S in lowland to subalpine scrub habitat particularly on cliffs and rocky places.

References

antipoda
Flora of New Zealand
Berries